Kalloori Vaasal is a 1996 Indian Tamil-language romantic comedy film directed by Pavithran. It stars Prashanth, Ajith Kumar, Pooja Bhatt and Devayani. The film released 18 February 1996.

Plot
Sathya and Vasanth are best friends since childhood. Kumaraswamy is working under Sathya's mother and he wants his daughter Pooja to marry Sathya so that he would be wealthy for the rest of his life. For this he makes many tricks and pranks to make them walk together alone, to go for a ride and many more. On Vasanth's birthday Sathya goes to wish him but he denies his wish and says his birthday means nothing to him anymore. Simultaneously Sathya's mother decides that her son is to marry Pooja and the engagement day arrives. Without informing her, when she enters the house as all the other guests did, Kumaraswamy insists that she wear the engagement saree. Knowing the situation she leaves the place crying and Sathya follows her. In the middle of the street he shouts at her and asks the reason why she can't marry him. She immediately shows her Mangala sutra (wedding thread) which she has hidden from everyone and reveals that she is already married.

The flashback begins with Nivetha and Pooja being best friends from school and on the first day of college Nivetha meets Vasanth and falls in love. Unaware of this, Pooja and Vasanth love each other. When Pooja discovers her friend's love for Vasanth, she decides to sacrifice her love. On Vasanth's birthday she denied her love for him and quickly he forcefully married her. Seeing this, Nivetha kills herself before their eyes. Pooja separates from Vasanth thinking that he was the reason for her friend's death.

After knowing this Sathya goes on to have a fight with Vasanth. But after knowing the truth, Sathya decides to sacrifice his love for Pooja and decides to unite Vasanth and Pooja. On a cultural day when Sathya, Vasanth and Pooja give a combined performance, the opposite gang led by Kumaraswamy plots against Vasanth and stabs him. The blame is then put on Sathya who is jailed. When Pooja sees her husband get hurt, she forgets everything and starts to cry for him. When Vasanth regains consciousness, he and Pooja finally are united.

Cast

Production
The film featured choreographer Kalyan in his acting debut as a college rogue. This was the only Tamil film which Pooja Bhatt had acted so far. In an interview, Ajith mentioned that he became good friends with the lead actress, Pooja Bhatt, despite initially finding her "aloof". During the production of the film, Prashanth was unhappy about the way that his character was depicted and his father Thyagarajan was involved in a spat with the director over the issue. Prashanth sported a ponytail for his role in the film.

Soundtrack

The film score and the soundtrack were composed by Deva. The soundtrack, released in 1996, features six tracks.

Release
The film opened on 18 February 1996 to mixed reviews with a critic claiming it is "supposed to be aimed at the college audience, but the way the story is, it does not seem to reach them". The film didn't perform well at the box office. The film was later dubbed and released in Telugu as College Gate and Hindi as Poojaa I Love You.

References

External links
 

1996 films
Films scored by Deva (composer)
1990s Tamil-language films
Films set in universities and colleges